Creme was a monthly New Zealand magazine for girls aged 10 to 18. The last issue was released in August 2014.

Overview
Creme was founded in 1999 by Natalie Chandulal and then sold to Waiata Publishing in 2003. The magazine was owned by the Bauer Media Group. The former owner was APN Specialist Publications NZ Limited. Bauer Media acquired it from APN in 2013.

The magazine covered the latest news, celebrity interviews, fashion trends, skincare and beauty, competitions and quizzes.  It also gave useful advice to young girls about body image, friend situations and health.  The magazine also featured about 5 posters in each issue.

Creme ceased publication with the last issue on 25 August 2014.

Team
The editorial staff included:

Kristina Rapley; editor, Amber Wijnstok;deputy editor, Anna Saveleva; designer, Louise Logan; fashion editor

and previously:

Alice O'Connell, editor; Emma Clifton, assistant editor; Emma Hepburn, art director; Virginia Brown, fashion & beauty editor; and Lisa Taylor, designer.

Creme Girl Ambassadors 
Since early 2008, Creme ran yearly competitions for girls who want to be the next Creme girl ambassador. The winner received her own monthly column in the magazine and her own interview.

List of Creme Girl Ambassadors:

 2008 - Christina Shewan
 2009 - Gini Letham

References

1999 establishments in New Zealand
2014 disestablishments in New Zealand
Bauer Media Group
Celebrity magazines
Defunct magazines published in New Zealand
Entertainment magazines
Magazines established in 1999
Magazines disestablished in 2014
Magazines published in New Zealand
Monthly magazines published in New Zealand
Teen magazines